St. Catherine's Montessori is a Catholic Montessori School in Houston, Texas.

St. Catherine's educates children ages 14 months to 15 years. The school is part of the Roman Catholic Archdiocese of Galveston-Houston.

See also

 Christianity in Houston

External links
St. Catherine's Montessori School

Catholic elementary schools in Houston
Montessori schools in the United States
1966 establishments in Texas